Clarissa Claretti (born 7 October 1980) is a former Italian female hammer thrower.

Personal best
Her personal best throw is 72.46 metres, achieved in July 2008 in Cagliari.

Achievements

National titles
She won 7 national championships at senior level.
Italian Athletics Championships
Hammer throw: 2002, 2003, 2006, 2007, 2008, 2009
Italian Winter Throwing Championships
Hammer throw: 2007

References

External links
 

1980 births
Living people
People from Fermo
Italian female hammer throwers
Athletes (track and field) at the 2004 Summer Olympics
Athletes (track and field) at the 2008 Summer Olympics
Olympic athletes of Italy
Athletics competitors of Centro Sportivo Aeronautica Militare
World Athletics Championships athletes for Italy
Mediterranean Games silver medalists for Italy
Athletes (track and field) at the 2005 Mediterranean Games
Athletes (track and field) at the 2009 Mediterranean Games
Mediterranean Games medalists in athletics
Competitors at the 2005 Summer Universiade
Sportspeople from the Province of Fermo
21st-century Italian women